Unvarnished is the twelfth studio album by American rock band Joan Jett and the Blackhearts, released on September 30, 2013. It reached number 47 on the US Billboard 200, becoming Jett's first album to chart since The Hit List (1990).

Track listing

Personnel

The Blackhearts
Joan Jett - lead vocals, rhythm guitar 
Dougie Needles	- lead guitar, backing vocals
Acey Slade - bass, backing vocals
Thommy Price - drums
Kenny Laguna - keyboards, percussion, melodica, backing vocals

Additional musicians
Joey Vasta - bass
Dave Grohl - all instruments on track 1, additional production on track 1
Jesse Levy - cello on tracks 6 and 10, orchestral arrangements, conductor
Regis Iandiorio, Michael Roth - violins on tracks 6 and 10
Olivia Koppell - viola on tracks 6 and 10
Gerard Reuter - oboe and french horn on track 10

Production
Joan Jett - production
Kenny Laguna - production
Thom Panunzio - additional production, engineer, mixing
Ken Dahlinger - mixing
John Lousteau - engineer on track 1
Kenta Yonasaka, Peter Kuperschmid - additional engineers
Carianne Brinkman - executive producer

Charts

References

2013 albums
Blackheart Records albums
Joan Jett albums